Nicolas  de Basville (1648–1724) was a French intendant over Languedoc in the early 18th century. 

He was accused by Voltaire of instigating the revocation of the Edict of Nantes.

References

1648 births
1724 deaths
Nicolas
17th-century French politicians